Phoebemima is a genus of longhorn beetles of the subfamily Lamiinae, containing the following species:

 Phoebemima aequatoria (Lane, 1970)
 Phoebemima albomaculata Martins & Galileo, 2008
 Phoebemima antiqua (Gahan, 1889)
 Phoebemima ensifera Tippmann, 1960
 Phoebemima teteia (Galileo & Martins, 1996)
 Phoebemima theaphia (Bates, 1881)

References

Hemilophini